Riley is an unincorporated community in Harney County, Oregon, United States, located at the crossroads of U.S. Highway 395 and U.S. Highway 20, milepost 104, about  west of Burns, the seat of Harney County. The town presently consists entirely of two service establishments with attached apartments: a post office, and a general store with gas pump and garage service. It exists to serve the rural farming and ranching community that surrounds it, and highway travelers.

Farmers grow alfalfa, hay, and root crops.

The town began with the establishment of a post office in about 1885, and was named for stockman Amos Riley of the ranching partnership Riley and Hardin. Riley's post office closed in 1919, but was reopened in 1949 after an office at Suntex was closed.

The Oregon Department of Transportation has a camera for road and weather conditions located at the intersection of U.S. 20 and U.S. 395 in Riley, facing west-northwest.

Climate

According to the Köppen Climate Classification system, Riley has a semi-arid climate, abbreviated "BSk" on climate maps.

Points of interest
 Chickahominy Reservoir
Unicorn Ranch

Transportation
In the 21st century, Riley is a stop on the Eastern POINT intercity bus line between Bend and Ontario. It makes one stop per day in each direction.

Education
The zoned K-8 school is Suntex Elementary School. The previous campus was destroyed in a 1978 fire.

High school students are zoned to Crane Union High School, of Harney County Union High School District 1J.

Harney County is not in a community college district but has a "contract out of district" (COD) with Treasure Valley Community College. TVCC operates the Burns Outreach Center in Burns.

References

External links
History of Riley from Harney County Chamber of Commerce

Unincorporated communities in Harney County, Oregon
1885 establishments in Oregon
Populated places established in 1885
Unincorporated communities in Oregon